Magill is an Irish surname. Notable people with the name include:

 Alan Magill (1953–2015), Director of Malaria Programs at the Bill & Melinda Gates Foundation
 Alfred Magill Randolph (1836–1918), U.S. Episcopal bishop
 Anne Magill, British artist and illustrator
 Archibald Magill Fauntleroy (1837–1886), U.S. physician
 Charles Magill Conrad (1804–1878), U.S. politician
 Charles Magill (1816–1898), member of the first Canadian Parliament and mayor of Hamilton 
 Charles Magill (Virginia judge) (1759-1827), U.S. lawyer, politician, and judge
 Dan Magill (1921–2014), sports director at the University of Georgia, U.S.
 Eddie Magill (born 1939),  Northern Irish footballer
 Elizabeth Magill (born 1959), Irish painter
 Frank Magill (footballer) (1896–1969), Australian rules footballer
 Frank J. Magill (1927–2013), U.S. judge
Franz Magill (1900–1972), SS war criminal
 Helen Magill White (1853–1944), first woman in the U.S. to earn a Ph.D.
 Ivan Magill (1888–1986), Irish-born anaesthetist
 Jimmy Magill (boxer) (1894–1942), Northern Irish amateur boxer 
 Juliette Augusta Magill Kinzie (1806–1870), U.S. historian, writer and pioneer
 Juliette Magill Kinzie Low (1860–1927), U.S. founder of Girl Scouts of the USA
 Louis J. Magill (1871–1921), U.S. Marines officer during the Spanish–American War
 Luke Magill (born 1987), English footballer
 Margaret Magill (1888–1962), New Zealand educator
 Matt Magill (born 1989), U.S. professional baseball player
 Mike Magill (1920–2006), U.S. racecar driver
 Ron Magill (born 1960), U.S. photographer and wildlife expert
 Ronald Magill (1920–2007), English actor
 Ronan Magill (born 1954), British concert pianist and composer
 Roswell Magill (1895–1963), U.S. tax lawyer and official of the Department of Treasury
 Sam Magill (born 1945), Australian rules footballer 
 Samuel Magill, mayor of Cumberland, Maryland, from 1823 to 1824
 Santiago Magill (born 1977), Peruvian actor
 Shawn Magill, member of the Canadian band Grade
 Simone Magill (born 1994), Northern Irish football player
 Theodosia Hawkins-Magill (1743–1817), Irish heiress and landowner

See also
 Magill (disambiguation)
 McGill (disambiguation)